Aswathi Menon  is an Indian actress who is known for her work in Malayalam films. She made her acting debut in the 2000 Malayalam film Sathyam Sivam Sundaram.<ref></ref</ref>

Early life 
Aswathi was born in Ernakulam, Kerala, India, to Jaygopal Menon and Vinitha Rao. After her schooling in Dubai's Varkey group of schools, she pursued her higher education in Kerala at St. Teresa's College, Ernakulam and at Sacred Heart College, Thevara to complete her MA in English Literature. She has a diploma from 'New York Film Academy' in Abu Dhabi for Film Acting.<ref></ref</ref>

Career 
Aswathi attended Varkey International Private School in Dubai, where she first began performing. She then began performing in Malayalam and Tamil films in South India. Aswathi was approached to play the lead role opposite Vijay in Kushi (2000), but turned down the offer to prioritise her studies.

Her debut appearance was in Sathyam Sivam Sundaram. This was followed by Shambho Mahadeva, Savithriyude Aranjanam, Onnaman and the Tamil film Thenkasi Pattanam (2002). After a hiatus, she returned in the 2017 film Role Models and Laughing Apartment Near Girinagar. She followed it with notable performances in Trance<ref></ref</ref> and June She associated with a music band called' "Kallinga". She was involved in theatre, arts etc. in Dubai. She worked in a corporate company in Dubai for 15 years.

Filmography

References

External links

 
 Aswathi Menon  Facebook

Year of birth missing (living people)
Living people
Indian film actresses
21st-century Indian actresses
Actresses in Malayalam cinema
Actresses from Kochi
Actresses in Tamil cinema
St. Teresa's College alumni